Valley Heights Jr/Sr High School is a public secondary school located between the cities of Blue Rapids and Waterville in Kansas.  It is operated by Valley Heights USD 498 school district, and serves students of grades 7 to 12.

History
Valley Heights Jr/Sr High School was built shortly after the formation of Valley Heights USD 498 public school district in 1966, which serves the communities of Blue Rapids and Waterville, Kansas. In conjunction with VHHS, the Valley Heights Public School District operates an elementary school in each town, and a preschool in Waterville.

Athletics
VHHS participates in KSHSAA sanctioned events under the classification of 1A. Athletic activities at Valley Heights includes football, basketball, volleyball, cross country, track and field, and golf.

See also

 List of high schools in Kansas
 List of unified school districts in Kansas

References

External links
 Valley Heights Jr./Sr. High School

Educational institutions established in 1971
Public high schools in Kansas
Schools in Marshall County, Kansas
Public middle schools in Kansas
1971 establishments in Kansas